Capital punishment in France ( is banned by Article 66-1 of the Constitution of the French Republic, voted as a constitutional amendment by the Congress of the French Parliament on 19 February 2007 and simply stating "No one can be sentenced to the death penalty". The death penalty was already declared illegal on 9 October 1981 when President François Mitterrand signed a law prohibiting the judicial system from using it and commuting the sentences of the seven people on death row to life imprisonment. The last execution took place by guillotine, being the main legal method since the French Revolution; Hamida Djandoubi, a Tunisian citizen convicted of torture and murder on French soil, who was put to death in September 1977 in Marseille.

Major French death penalty abolitionists across time have included philosopher Voltaire; poet Victor Hugo; politicians Léon Gambetta, Jean Jaurès and Aristide Briand; and writers Alphonse de Lamartine and Albert Camus.

History

Ancien Régime 

Prior to 1791, under the Ancien Régime, there existed a variety of means of capital punishment in France, depending on the crime and the status of the condemned person:
 Hanging was the most common punishment. 
 Decapitation by sword, for nobles only.
 Burning for arson, bestiality, heresy, sodomy, and witchcraft. The convict was occasionally discreetly strangled.
 Breaking wheel for brigandage and murder. The convict could be strangled before having his limbs broken or after, depending on the atrocity of his crime.
 Death by boiling for counterfeiting.
 Dismemberment for high treason, parricide, and regicide.

On 6 July 1750, Jean Diot and Bruno Lenoir were strangled and burned at the stake in Place de Grève for sodomy, the last known execution for sodomy in France. Also in 1750, Jacques Ferron was either hanged or burned at the stake in Vanvres for bestiality, the last known execution for bestiality in France.

Adoption of the guillotine 

The first campaign towards the abolition of the death penalty began on 30 May 1791, but on 6 October that year the National Assembly refused to pass a law abolishing the death penalty. However, they did abolish torture, and also declared that there would now be only one method of execution: 'Tout condamné à mort aura la tête tranchée' (All condemned to death will have their heads cut off).

In 1789, physician Joseph-Ignace Guillotin proposed that all executions be carried out by a simple and painless mechanism, which led to the development and eventual adoption of the guillotine. Beheading had previously been reserved only for nobles and carried out manually by handheld axes or blades; commoners would usually be hanged or subjected to more brutal methods. Therefore, the adoption of the guillotine for all criminals regardless of social status not only made executions more efficient and less painful, but it also removed the class divisions in capital punishment altogether. As a result, many felt the device made the death penalty more humane and egalitarian.

The guillotine was first used on Nicolas Jacques Pelletier on 25 April 1792. Guillotine usage then spread to other countries such as Germany (where it had been used since before the revolution), Italy, Sweden (used in a single execution), the Netherlands and French colonies in Africa, Canada, French Guiana and French Indochina. Although other governments employed the device, France has executed more people by guillotine than any other nation.

Penal Code of 1791

On October 6, 1791, the Penal Code of 1791 was enacted, which abolished capital punishment in the Kingdom of France for bestiality, blasphemy, heresy, pederasty, sacrilege, sodomy, and witchcraft.

1939 onwards 

Public executions were the norm and continued until 1939. From the mid-19th century, the usual time of day for executions changed from around 3 pm to morning and then to dawn. Executions had been carried out in large central public spaces such as market squares but gradually moved towards the local prison. In the early 20th century, the guillotine was set up just outside the prison gates. The last person to be publicly guillotined was six-time murderer Eugen Weidmann who was executed on 17 June 1939 outside the St-Pierre prison in Versailles. Photographs of the execution appeared in the press, and apparently this spectacle led the government to stop public executions and to hold them instead in prison courtyards, such as La Santé Prison in Paris. Following the law, the first to be guillotined inside a prison was Jean Dehaene, who had murdered his estranged wife and father-in-law, executed on 19 July 1939 at St-Brieuc.

The 1940s and the wartime period saw an increase in the number of executions, including the first executions of women since the 19th century.

Marie-Louise Giraud was executed on 30 July 1943 for being an abortion provider, which was labeled a crime against state security.

In the 1950s to the 1970s, the number of executions steadily decreased, with for example President Georges Pompidou, between 1969 and 1974, giving clemency to all but three people out of the fifteen sentenced to death.  President Valéry Giscard d'Estaing oversaw the last executions.

Up to 1981, the French penal code stated that:
 Article 12: "Any person sentenced to death shall be decapitated."
 Article 13: "By exception to article 12, when the death penalty is handed down for crimes against the safety of the State, execution shall take place by firing squad."
 Article 14: "If the families of the executed persons wish to reclaim the bodies, they shall have them; it shall then be for them to have them buried without any pomp."
In addition, crimes such as treason, espionage, insurrection, piracy, aggravated murder, kidnapping with torture, felonies committed with the use of torture, setting a bomb in a street, arson of a dwelling house, and armed robbery made their authors liable to the death penalty; moreover, committing some military offenses such as mutiny or desertion or being accomplice or attempting to commit a capital felony were also capital offenses.

Clemency 
The right to commute death sentences belonged exclusively to the President of the Republic, whereas it had belonged exclusively to the monarch in earlier ages.

President Charles de Gaulle, who supported capital punishment, commuted 24 death sentences. During his term of office, 24 people were guillotined, 4 others executed by firing squad for crimes against the security of the state, while 3 other were reprieved by amnesty in 1968. The last of those executed by firing squad was OAS member Lt. Colonel Jean-Marie Bastien-Thiry, who was an organizer of the infamous assassination attempt on de Gaulle in 1962.

No executions took place during two-term Interim President Alain Poher, in 1969 and 1974.

President Georges Pompidou, who opposed capital punishment, commuted all but three death sentences imposed during his term.

President Valéry Giscard d'Estaing, who stated that he "felt a deep aversion to the death penalty", also commuted all but three death sentences. He was President at the time of the last execution in France.

Amnesty 
Parliament (rather than the executive) held the power to grant amnesty for death sentences. One example of general amnesty for all people sentenced to death and awaiting execution took place in 1959 after de Gaulle's inauguration when an Act of Parliament  commuted all such sentences.

Abolition 
The first official debate on the death penalty in France took place on 30 May 1791 with the presentation of a bill aimed at abolishing it. The advocate was Louis-Michel Lepeletier of Saint-Fargeau and revolutionary leader Maximilien de Robespierre supported the bill. However, the National Constituent Assembly, on 6 October 1791, refused to abolish the death penalty. Soon after, tens of thousands of people of various social classes would be executed by guillotine during the Reign of Terror.

On 26 October 1795, the National Convention abolished capital punishment, but only to signify the day of general peace. The death penalty was reinstated on 12 February 1810, under Emperor Napoleon I, in the French Imperial Penal Code.

In 1848, the provisional government of the French Second Republic, established by the February Revolution, decreed the abolition of the death penalty for political crimes.

President Armand Fallières, a supporter of abolition, systematically pardoned every convict condemned to death over the first three years of his term (1906-1913). In 1906 the Commission of the Budget of the Chamber of Deputies voted for withdrawing funding for the guillotine, with the aim of stopping the execution procedure. On 3 July 1908 the Garde des Sceaux, Aristide Briand, submitted a draft law to the Deputies, dated November 1906, on the abolition of the death penalty. Despite the support of Jean Jaurès, the bill was rejected on 8 December by 330 votes to 201.

Under the pro-Nazi Vichy Regime, Marshal Pétain refused to pardon five women due to be guillotined; no woman had been guillotined in France in over five decades. Pétain was himself sentenced to death following the overthrow of the Vichy Regime, but General Charles de Gaulle commuted Pétain's sentence to life imprisonment on the grounds of his old age (89 years), as well as his previous military service during the First World War. Other Vichy officials, including notably Pierre Laval, were not so fortunate and were shot. Under Vincent Auriol's presidency, three more women were beheaded, one in Algeria and two in France. The last Frenchwoman to be beheaded (Germaine Leloy-Godefroy) was executed in Angers in 1949. In 1963, Lt. Colonel Jean-Marie Bastien-Thiry became the last person to be executed by a firing squad.

Defended by lawyer Robert Badinter, child murderer Patrick Henry narrowly escaped being condemned to death on 20 January 1977, and numerous newspapers predicted the end of the death penalty. On 10 September 1977, Hamida Djandoubi was guillotined and became both the last person executed in France as well as the last person executed by beheading in the Western world, and by any means in Western Europe. On September 18, 1981, Badinterthe new Minister of Justiceproposed the final abolition of the death penalty in the National Assembly, the same day as the newly-elected socialist president François Mitterrand backed his efforts, and the National Assembly finally pushed abolition through that same year. Badinter had been a longtime opponent of capital punishment and the defense attorney of some of the last men to be executed.

Abolition process in 1981

 16 March 1981: During the presidential election campaign, François Mitterrand declared that he was against the death penalty. This was taken up in the Socialist Party's 110 Propositions for France electoral program, along with other justice reforms.
 19 March: The last sentence of death (against Philippe Maurice) was confirmed by the court of cassation, the last to gain legal force.
 10 May: Mitterrand was elected President in the second round against Valery Giscard d'Estaing.
 25 May: François Mitterrand pardoned Philippe Maurice, commuting the sentence to life imprisonment. He was released on license in 2000.
 26 August: the Council of Ministers approved the bill to abolish the death penalty.
 17 September: Robert Badinter presented the bill to the Assemblée Nationale. It passed on 18 September, by 363 votes to 117. 
 28 September: The cour d'assises of Haut-Rhin issued the very last sentence of death against tailor Jean-Paul Marx for attempted murder. A total of seven sentences of death were issued by the lower courts after Philippe's case, but never ratified by the court of cassation. 
 30 September: several amendments were rejected in the Sénat. The law was officially passed by the two chambers.
 9 October: the law was promulgated and all seven remaining sentences commuted. The last Western European country to practise the death penalty abolished it.

Current status
Today, the death penalty has been abolished in France. Although a few modern-day French politicians (notably the far-right Front national former leader Jean-Marie Le Pen) advocate restoring the death penalty, its re-establishment would not be possible without the unilateral French rejection of several international treaties. (Repudiation of international treaties is not unknown to the French system, as France renounced its obligations under the NATO treaty in 1966, though it rejoined the pact in 2009.)

On 20 December 1985, France ratified Additional Protocol number 6 to the European Convention to Safeguard Human Rights and fundamental liberties. This prevents France from re-establishing the death penalty, except in times of war or by denouncing the Convention.

On 21 June 2001, Jacques Chirac sent a letter to the association "Ensemble" saying he was against the death penalty: "It's a fight we have to lead with determination and conviction, because no justice is infallible and each execution can kill an innocent; because nothing can legitimise the execution of minors or of people suffering from mental deficiencies; because death can never constitute an act of justice." On 3 May 2002, France and 30 other countries signed Protocol number 13 to the European Convention on Human Rights. This forbids the death penalty in all circumstances, even in times of war. It went into effect on 1 July 2003, after having been ratified by 10 states.

Despite these efforts, in 2004, a law proposition (number 1521) was placed before the French National Assembly, suggesting re-establishment of the death penalty for terrorist acts.  The bill was not adopted. On 3 January 2006, Jacques Chirac announced a revision of the Constitution aimed at writing out the death penalty. (On the previous 13 October, the Constitutional Council had deemed the ratification of the Second Optional Protocol to the international pact necessitated such a revision of the Constitution. The protocol concerned civil and political rights aimed at abolishing the death penalty.)

On 19 February 2007, the Congress of the French Parliament (the National Assembly and the Senate, reunited for the day) voted overwhelmingly for a modification of the Constitution stating that "no one can be sentenced to the death penalty." There were 828 votes for the modification, and 26 against. The amendment entered the Constitution on 23 February.

Variations in French opinion
During the 20th century, French opinion on the death penalty has greatly changed, as many polls have showed large differences from one time to another.

 In 1908, Le Petit Parisien published a poll in which 77% of people asked were in favour of the death penalty.
 In 1960, a survey from the IFOP showed that 50% of the French were against, while 39% were for.
 In 1972, in a survey from the same institute, 27% of those surveyed were for abolition while 63% were for capital punishment.
 In 1981, Le Figaro carried out a survey the day after the vote for abolition. It indicated that 62% of the French were for maintaining the death penalty.
 In 1998, IFOP's and France-Soir'''s survey showed that opinions were split in half, with 54% against the death penalty and 44% for it.
 In 2006, TNS Sofres survey show opposition of the French people to death penalty generally: 52% are now against death penalty and 41% are pro-death penalty.
 In 2007, according to Angus Reid Global Monitor, 52% of French are anti-death penalty and 45% are pro-death penalty.
 In 2013, a Opinionway survey shows that 50% of the French people support re-introduction of the death penalty, up from 45% in 2012 and 35% in 2011.
 In 2020, a Ipsos/Sopra Steria survey showed that 55% of the French people support re-introduction of the death penalty. The survey found that 85% percent of voters of the National Rally party (RN) support the death penalty, with 71% for the conservative party Les Républicains, and 39% for the LaRem, Socialists, the Green party and the far-left party (France Unbowed).

Executions from 1958 to abolition
The following people were executed during the Fifth Republic (between 1959 and 1977), making them the last executed people in France.

Notable opponents
 Michel de Montaigne (writer and philosopher)
 Voltaire (writer and philosopher)
 Nicolas de Condorcet (philosopher) 
 Victor Hugo (writer and politician)
 Alphonse de Lamartine (writer and politician)
 Léon Gambetta (politician)
 Jean Jaurès (Socialist leader)
 Aristide Briand (politician, long-time President of the Council and Minister)
 Gaston Leroux (writer)
 Albert Camus (writer)
 Noëlla Rouget (French Resistance member and teacher)
 Michel Foucault (philosopher)
 Robert Badinter (attorney and Minister of Justice)
 Julien Clerc (singer)

Notable advocates
 Francis I of France (King of France)
 Catherine de' Medici (Queen Regent and Queen consort of France)
 Henry IV of France (King of France)
 Cardinal Richelieu (Prime Minister of France)
 Louis XIII (King of France)
 Louis XIV (King of France)
 Louis XV (King of France)
 Charles de Secondat, baron de Montesquieu (philosopher)
 Jean-Jacques Rousseau (philosopher)
 Louis XVI (King of France, then King of the French)
 Marie Antoinette (Queen consort of France)
 Napoleon Bonaparte (Emperor of the French)
 Napoleon III (Emperor of the French)
 Louis XVIII (King of the French)
 Charles X (King of France)
 Louis-Philippe I (King of the French)
 Joseph De Maistre (philosopher and diplomat)
 Alexis De Tocqueville (philosopher and diplomat)
 Benjamin Constant (philosopher and politician)
 Auguste Comte (philosopher)
 Maurice Barrès (writer and politician)
 Charles de Gaulle (President) (only for men; commuted half of the sentences)
 Jean-Marie Le Pen (politician)
 Alain Madelin (politician)
 Robert Ménard (politician)
 Éric Zemmour (writer and journalist)

References

Bibliography
Klemettilä, Hannele: The executioner in late medieval French culture''. Turun yliopiston julkaisuja. Sarja B, Humaniora. vol.268. Tuku: Turun Yliplisto, 2003. .

 
Law enforcement in France
1981 in France
1981 disestablishments in France
Death in France